Muchalat Inlet is an oceanographic/geographical region on the western coast of Vancouver Island, British Columbia, Canada. Muchalat Inlet extends  from Nootka Sound to the east, terminating at Muchalat Bay. Located broadly south of Gold River, British Columbia, the area borders Mowachaht/Muchalaht First Nations reserve lands. The inlet is somewhat under-researched, with a complex runoff/renewal cycle supported by drainage from mountain terrain in the surrounding region.

Though remote, the region gained some notice in 2004–2006 during the Luna incident, in which policies regarding an orca separated from its pod led to confrontations between the Department of Fisheries and Oceans and the borders Mowachaht/Muchalaht First Nations.

References 
 

Inlets of British Columbia
Bodies of water of Vancouver Island